Vanguard is a village in the Canadian province of Saskatchewan within the Rural Municipality of Whiska Creek No. 106 and Census Division No. 3. It is on Highway 43 close to Notekeu Creek. Its prime economic driver is agriculture: chick peas; lentils; red, spring, hard and durum wheats are grown here.

History 
In 1910, the Canadian Pacific Railway purchased the land that became the community of Vanguard from Latimer Young. Vanguard incorporated as a village on July 8, 1912. The origin of the name Vanguard may be attributed to it having been on the vanguard of the railway in 1912; however,  is also a name in the Royal Navy tradition. Lord Horatio Nelson had a Vanguard; the last dreadnought battleship (scrapped in 1960) was also called Vanguard. Regardless of the true origin of the name, the north–south streets in Vanguard reflect the naval heritage, being named Armada, Victory, Triumph, Drake and Nelson Streets. The east–west streets are named in honour of the province (Saskatchewan Avenue), the landscape in which Vanguard is situated (Prairie Avenue), the rail heritage (Railway Avenue) and the hopeful spirit in which Vanguard was established (Progress Avenue). Vanguard is bisected by Division St. and the main street is called "Dominion".

Demographics 

Attractions 
Nearby communities are Pambrun (home of Millar College of the Bible), Gravelbourg (renowned for its French heritage and cathedral), Swift Current (the regional "headquarters"), Hodgeville ("home" of the Saskatchewan flag) and Ponteix (close to Notekeu Regional Park).  Vanguard is close to Cypress Hills inter-provincial park, Grasslands National Park, the Canada–US border, and Lac Pelletier Regional Park.

Education 
Vanguard is the home of Vanguard Community School with specialist teachers, low student-teacher ratio, and an enrollment of approximately 100.

Notable people 
Author, broadcaster, and journalist James Minifie (1900–1974) called Vanguard home.  He worked for the New York Herald Tribune and was the Washington correspondent for the CBC.  Knowlton Nash described Mr. Minifie as: "a man passionately dedicated to improving the quality of journalism [whose] overwhelming desire was accuracy in reporting".  Woodrow Lloyd, former premier of Saskatchewan, was a principal in Vanguard.  NHL goaltender, Al Rollins, was born in Vanguard.

See also 

 List of communities in Saskatchewan

References 

Villages in Saskatchewan
Whiska Creek No. 106, Saskatchewan
Division No. 3, Saskatchewan